Morven is a historic home located near Cartersville, Cumberland County, Virginia.  It was built in 1820, and is a two-story, three bay, central hall plan brick dwelling in the Federal style. The property was used by as a retreat for the Harrison and Randolph families until 1870.

It was listed on the National Register of Historic Places in 1990.

References

Houses on the National Register of Historic Places in Virginia
Federal architecture in Virginia
Houses completed in 1885
Houses in Cumberland County, Virginia
National Register of Historic Places in Cumberland County, Virginia